Pimpri Jalsen is a village in Parner taluka in Ahmednagar district of state of Maharashtra, India.

Religion
The majority of the population in the village is Hindu Martha and also Muslim people leave in village.

Temple
Gram Daivat: Rokdoba and other temple Navlabai Mandir, Datta Mandir, Shiv shankar Mandir Wadhavane Mala, Gaighatbaba, Shree shankarnath baba and Nurani masjid

Population
Population is about 3000.

Voter
Total=1718

Villages in Ahmednagar district